The Rogers House is an historic house located at 136 Spring Road in Huntington, New York, which was built in 1820 in the Greek Revival style. It was added to the National Register of Historic Places in 1985.

See also
 John Rogers House (Huntington, New York), located at 627 Half Hollow Road in Dix Hills, which was also added to the National Register of Historic Places on the same date.

References

External links
The Rogers House (Huntington Patch)

Houses on the National Register of Historic Places in New York (state)
Houses in Suffolk County, New York
National Register of Historic Places in Suffolk County, New York
Houses completed in 1820